Eupithecia dichroma is a moth in the family Geometridae first described by James Halliday McDunnough in 1946. It is found in western North America, including Washington, Utah, Colorado, Oregon, New Mexico and Arizona.

References

Moths described in 1946
dichroma
Moths of North America